Thomas Manduis Farmer (April 17, 1921 – July 1, 1980) was an American football halfback in the National Football League (NFL). He played for the Los Angeles Rams (1946) and the Washington Redskins (1947–1948).  He played college football at the University of Iowa and was drafted in the second round of the 1943 NFL Draft by the Cleveland Rams.

References

1921 births
1980 deaths
American football halfbacks
Iowa Hawkeyes football players
Los Angeles Rams players
Washington Redskins players
Sportspeople from Cedar Rapids, Iowa
Players of American football from Iowa